As Needed is a 2018 Italian comedy film by Francesco Falaschi.

Plot
Arturo (Vinicio Marchioni) was a well known chef. He ends up in prison for anger issues. After he gets out, he must work at social services and teaches a group of people with Asperger syndrome to cook. One of his students, Guido (Luigi Fedele), succeeds to get into a culinary competition. As his tutor, Arturo must face the specific behavior of Guido, becomes drawn into his world and starts to care about him.

Cast
Vinicio Marchioni as Arturo
Luigi Fedele as Guido
Valeria Solarino as Anna
Nicola Siri as Marinari
Mirko Frezza as Marione
Stephanie de Jongh as Concierge
Benedetta Porcaroli as Giulietta
Gianfranco Gallo as Corradi
Alessandro Haber as Celso
Ludovica Bargellini as Escort

References

External links

 

2018 films
2018 comedy films
Italian comedy films
Films directed by Francesco Falaschi
Films set in Tuscany
Cooking films
Films about food and drink
Films about chefs
2010s Italian films